Yunus Nadi Abalıoğlu (1879, Fethiye – 28 June 1945) was a renowned Turkish journalist and the founder of the newspaper Cumhuriyet. He was known to be a sympathizer of the Nazi regime before the war, as he published many antisemitic propaganda articles praising Adolf Hitler.

Biography 

Yunus Nadi was born in 1879 in the Seydiler village of the south Aegean town Fethiye. After primary school in Fethiye, he was schooled on Rhodes. Later on, Yunus Nadi moved to Istanbul. He graduated from Galatasaray High School. He then graduated from the Istanbul University with a degree in Law.

Yunus Nadi started to work as a journalist at the newspaper "Malumat" in 1900. He was only 22 years old when he was sentenced to a three-years prison and exile due to an article he wrote in 1901. Until the proclamation of the Second Constitutional Monarchy in 1908, he lived in Fethiye. Returning to Istanbul, Yunus Nadi joined the newspaper "İkdam ve Tasvir-i Efkar". In 1910 he became the editor-in-chief of the newspaper "Rumeli" in Thessaloniki published by the Committee for Union and Progress party.

At the age of 32, he was elected Deputy of Aydın into the Ottoman Parliament in Constantinople in 1912 and was reelected for another five-years term in 1914.

The literary Yunus Nadi Prize competition, which is "the oldest surviving literary competition"  in Turkey, has been named to his name and memorial.

Turkish War of Independence

"Yeni Gün" was the only media to covered the Turkish War of Independence to the rest of the world. Yunus Nadi founded the newspaper "Yeni Gün". Despite censorship and pressures from the invading forces, he continued to support Mustafa Kemal's independence movement, which was set up on May 19, 1919 in Samsun. After the invasion of Constantinople by the British, French, Italian and Greek forces on November 13, 1918, Parliament banned him. He fled to Ankara in order to escape arrest.

Yunus Nadi was welcomed by Mustafa Kemal with great enthusiasm on April 2, 1920. He started to publish his newspaper "Yeni Gün" again on August 9, 1920 in Ankara. The printing machine used in Constantinople was dismantled and smuggled into Ankara in separated parts. Members of his family also followed Yunus Nadi to Ankara.

Yunus Nadi established the news agency "Anadolu Ajansı" together with Halide Edib. Meanwhile, he was elected a member of the newly formed Turkish Grand National Assembly as Deputy of İzmir. His newspaper had to be moved to Kayseri because of the nearing Greek forces to Ankara during the Battle of Sakarya.

During the summer months of 1923, newspapers in Constantinople were sharply against the proclamation of republic. Yunus Nadi was working very closely with Mustafa Kemal and was the head of the parliament commission, which was working on the new constitution.  On October 29, 1923 Yunus Nadi read the new constitution in parliament after the proclamation of the republic.

Republican period

Mustafa Kemal tried to convince some mild representatives of opposing newspapers of Istanbul in a meeting held in İzmir on January 5, 1924 without success. These newspapers intensified their negative attitudes instead and attacked openly the regime in Ankara. This led Mustafa Kemal to commission Yunus Nadi to establish a new newspaper in Constantinople, to propagate and defend the principles of the republic and the democracy against the monarchy and the caliphate. The preparations continued until the end of April 1924 and the first issue of the newspaper was published on May 7, 1924. The newspaper was named "Cumhuriyet" (literally republic in Turkish) by Mustafa Kemal. "Cumhuriyet" has a current circulation of approximately 38,000 copies, and is a left-wing publication Yunus Nadi, who took the family name Abalıoğlu, owned the newspaper and was editor-in-chief until his death on June 28, 1945 in a hospital in Geneva, Switzerland. The newspaper was owned later on by his eldest son Nadir Nadi and then by Nadir Nadi's wife Berin. Currently, the foundation "Cumhuriyet Vakfı" is the publisher.

His remains were brought to Istanbul and buried at the Edirnekapı Martyr's Cemetery.

Sources

1879 births
1945 deaths
People from Fethiye
Galatasaray High School alumni
Istanbul University Faculty of Law alumni
Cumhuriyet people
Malta exiles
Members of Kuva-yi Milliye
Burials at Edirnekapı Martyr's Cemetery
Turkish newspaper publishers (people)
Deputies of Izmir
Journalists from the Ottoman Empire